Edward Stanley "Eddie" Slowinski (November 18, 1922 – August 21, 1999) was a Canadian professional ice hockey player who played 291 games in the National Hockey League (NHL) between 1947 and 1953. Born in Winnipeg, Manitoba, he spent most of his career with the New York Rangers.

Career
Slowinski began his junior career with the Winnipeg Monarchs in the playoffs of the 1940-41 season, scoring two goals in three games. He stayed in Winnipeg for one more season before moving on to the Ottawa Army and then Ottawa Commandos. Over the next few years he went from team to team - the Red Deer Rangers, Calgary and Winnipeg Navy, and the Ottawa Senators - before making it to the NHL. The New York Rangers put Slowinski into their lineup for the 1947-48 season and, despite playing a handful of games for their AHL team, he was a New York Ranger for his whole career.

In the 1949-50 Stanley Cup playoffs, the Rangers were up three games to two over the Red Wings when the Wings came back and took the championship in overtime of the seventh game. Slowinski led all scorers in assists that playoff year but never held the Stanley Cup. He played five more seasons of pro hockey in the AHL before retiring after the 1957–58 season.

Career statistics

Regular season and playoffs

Awards and achievements
MJHL First All-Star Team (1942)
USHL Championship (1949)
AHL First All-Star Team (1954)
Honoured Member of the Manitoba Hockey Hall of Fame

References

External links

Ed Slowinski's biography at Manitoba Hockey Hall of Fame

1922 births
1999 deaths
Buffalo Bisons (AHL) players
Canadian ice hockey right wingers
Canadian military personnel of World War II
New Haven Ramblers players
New York Rangers players
Ottawa Senators (QSHL) players
Providence Reds players
St. Paul Saints (USHL) players
Ice hockey people from Winnipeg
Springfield Indians players
Winnipeg Monarchs players